Angraecum mauritianum is a small, epiphytic species of orchid. 
It is native to Mauritius where it can still be found along roadsides. It favours low tree trunks or logs, and does not grow higher up in trees.

References

mauritianum
Orchids of Mauritius
Plants described in 1889